"Cry" is a 1951 popular song written by Churchill Kohlman. The song was first recorded by Ruth Casey on the Cadillac label. The biggest hit version was recorded in New York City by Johnnie Ray and The Four Lads on October 16, 1951.  Singer Ronnie Dove also had a big hit with the song in 1966.

Johnnie Ray & The Four Lads version
Johnnie Ray recorded the song at Columbia's 30th Street Studio in New York City, with his version of the song being released on Columbia Records subsidiary label Okeh Records as catalog number Okeh 6840. It was a No.1 hit on the Billboard magazine chart that year, and one side of one of the biggest two-sided hits, as the flip side, "The Little White Cloud That Cried," reached No.2 on the Billboard chart. This recording also hit number one on the R&B Best Sellers lists and the flip side,  "The Little White Cloud that Cried," peaked at number six. When the single started to crack the charts the single was released on Columbia Records catalog number Co 39659.

Stan Freberg satirized this song, under the title "Try", and reported getting more angry feedback than from any of his many other parodies.

Ronnie Dove Version

Ronnie Dove had a hit with the song in 1966.  Released in November, it would reach the Top 20 on both the Pop and Easy Listening Charts by the end of the year.  He would go on to perform this song on The Ed Sullivan Show early the following year.  This would become Ronnie's last Top 40 hit, although he would continue to chart on the Easy Listening and, later, country charts.

Chart history

Lynn Anderson version

Lynn Anderson had major success in the country music market with her 1972 version, released on Columbia Records, which hit No.1 on the Cashbox country charts, and No. 3 on the Billboard magazine Hot Country Singles chart.  It also charted in the Top 20 on the U.S. Adult Contemporary Charts.

Chart history

Year-end charts

Crystal Gayle version

Crystal Gayle had her own hit version of the song in 1986, taking it to No. 1 on the Billboard magazine Hot Country Singles chart.

Chart history

Dutch-language versions
In 1982, singer/comedian André van Duin recorded it as "Als je huilt" (a double A-side with his take on Edith Piaf's "Les Trois Cloches") which became a #1-hit in the Dutch Top 40 by mid-August. During TV-promotion he wore specially designed specs with an in-built water-sprayer for audience-exposure.

Other versions
Stan Freberg did a 1952 parody of Johnnie Ray's version of "Cry" entitled "Try", in which he did an emotional "sobbing out of tune" performance with different lyrics.  The lyrics include the title of the B-side song "The Little White Cloud That Cried", in the line "even little white clouds do it". Johnnie Ray was not initially pleased with this parody. However, he later accepted Freberg's version.
Brenda Lee recorded the song for her 1961 Emotions album.
Gene McDaniels recorded the song for his album 100 Lbs. of Clay! in 1961.
Timi Yuro recorded the song in 1961 for her album Hurt!
Paul Anka recorded the song as a B-side of "I'm Coming Home" in 1962 on ABC-Paramount 45-10338.
Lesley Gore recorded the song on her 1963 debut album I'll Cry If I Want To.
Ray Charles recorded the song on his 1964 album Sweet & Sour Tears.
Tammy Wynette recorded the song on her 1968 album, Take Me to Your World / I Don't Wanna Play House.
Mina sang the song on her 1968 live album Mina alla Bussola dal vivo.
Diana Trask took a version to #99 on the country singles charts in 1975.
Kevin Coyne included a cover of the song on his 1978 album, Dynamite Daze.
David Cassidy did a cover of the song for his 2002 album Then and Now.
Liza Minnelli recorded a version on her 2002 CD Liza's Back.
Eros and the Eschaton recorded a version for Bar None Records in 2014.
Lorrie Morgan recorded the song for her 2009 A Moment in Time album.

References

1951 songs
Johnnie Ray songs
Ray Charles songs
Lynn Anderson songs
1952 singles
1972 singles
1986 singles
Crystal Gayle songs
Number-one singles in the United States
Dutch Top 40 number-one singles
Grammy Hall of Fame Award recipients
Diana Trask songs
Song recordings produced by Jim Ed Norman
Columbia Records singles
Warner Records singles
Okeh Records singles